Rubber dam may refer to:
Dental dam
Inflatable rubber dam